Fati may refer to the following people: 
Given name
Fati Abubakar, Nigerian photojournalist 
Fati Jamali (born 1988), Moroccan actress and TV presenter
Fati Lami Abubakar (born 1951), former First Lady of Nigeria 
Fati Mariko (born 1964), Nigerian singer
Fati Mohammed (born 1979), Ghanaian football goalkeeper

Middle name
José Fati Tepano, Easter Island judge
Sharif Fati Ali Al Mishad (born 1976), Egyptian prisoner in the United States

Surname
Ansu Fati (born 2002), Spanish footballer
Braima Fati, his older brother
Miguel Fati, his brother
Ença Fati (born 1993), Bissau-Guinean footballer

See also
Fathi
Fathy
Fethi